Dicerandra fumella is a species of Dicerandra native to the Florida Panhandle. It was formerly classified as a variety of Dicerandra linearifolia. A hybrid zone between Dicerandra fumella and Dicerandra linearifolia var. robustior is located in the Marianna Lowland, west of the Apalachicola River in Florida.

References

fumella